Dry Well Creek is a stream in Harney County, Oregon, United States in the Harney Basin of Eastern Oregon. It is among streams in the drainage basin of Malheur Lake, a Great Basin water body with no outlet.

Dry Well Creek is an intermittent fish-bearing stream that flows into Emigrant Creek, a tributary of the Silvies River. The creek is part of a watershed restoration project. Resident aquatic species in the project area include Great Basin redband trout, Malheur mottled sculpin, speckled and longnose dace, redside shiners, bridgelip suckers, Columbia spotted frogs, crayfish and western pearlshell mussels.

See also
List of rivers of Oregon

References

Rivers of Harney County, Oregon
Rivers of Oregon